BBC Radio Gloucestershire is the BBC's local radio station serving the county of Gloucestershire.

It broadcasts on FM, DAB, AM, digital TV and via BBC Sounds from studios at Portland Court in Gloucester.

According to RAJAR, the station has a weekly audience of 74,000 listeners and a 5.1% share as of December 2022.

Transmitters
The main FM transmitter is at Churchdown Hill near to jct 11 on the M5 which broadcasts on 104.7 FM to Gloucester, Cheltenham and Tewkesbury. The FM output is relayed from the Stroud transmitter on 95 FM and from the Cirencester transmitter on 95.8 FM.

The DAB transmitters are located at Churchdown Hill (for the Severn Vale, including the Cheltenham/Gloucester conurbation), Stockend Wood (for south of Gloucester, parts of Stroud Valleys and shores of River Severn), Icomb Hill, near Bourton-on-the-Water (for the north Cotswolds) and Cirencester (for the south Cotswolds).  The station commenced broadcasting on DAB digital radio on 18 October 2013 as part of the Gloucestershire local multiplex.

The AM transmitter is at Berkeley Heath and broadcasts on 1413 KHz to the Forest of Dean, Dursley and Stroud valleys. AM transmissions from Stow-on-the-Wold to the north Cotswolds ceased on 7 June 2021.  

Radio Gloucestershire is also available on Freeview TV channel 735. Viewers in Gloucestershire who see BBC Points West, BBC Midlands Today or BBC South Today (Oxford) at 1830 (Mon-Fri) receive the station on channel 735.

Radio Gloucestershire can be heard worldwide via BBC Sounds on phone apps and smart speaker devices. Audio heard on BBC Sounds is the same as FM output.  Most football commentaries cannot be heard online due to sports rights restrictions but FA Cup football games can be heard online in the UK. Most Gloucester Rugby games can be heard worldwide with the exception of European Champions Cup games which can only be heard in the UK.

Programming
Local programming is produced and broadcast from the BBC's Gloucester studios from 6am - 10pm on Sundays - Fridays and from 6am - 6pm on Saturdays.

The weekday late show, airing from 10pm-1am, originates from BBC Radio Gloucestershire and goes out to the BBC West region. Sunday afternoon programming is shared between BBC Radio Gloucestershire and BBC Radio Wiltshire. At weekends, the late show originates from BBC Radio Devon in Plymouth. BBC Introducing in the West is presented from BBC Radio Wiltshire's Swindon studios.

During the station's downtime, BBC Radio Gloucestershire simulcasts overnight programming from BBC Radio 5 Live and BBC Radio London.

References

External links 
 

Gloucestershire
Organisations based in Gloucestershire
Radio stations established in 1988
Radio stations in Gloucestershire